

This is a list of craters on Mars. Impact craters on Mars larger than  exist by the hundreds of thousands, but only about one thousand of them have names. Names are assigned by the International Astronomical Union after petitioning by relevant scientists, and in general, only craters that have a significant research interest are given names. Craters cannot be named for living people, and names for small craters are rarely intended to commemorate a specific town. Latitude and longitude are given as planetographic coordinates with west longitude.

Catalog of named craters 

The catalog is divided into three partial lists:
 List of craters on Mars: A–G
 List of craters on Mars: H–N
 List of craters on Mars: O–Z

Names are grouped into tables for each letter of the alphabet, containing the crater's name (linked if article exists), coordinates, diameter in kilometers, year of official name adoption (approval), the eponym ("named after") and a direct reference to the Gazetteer of Planetary Nomenclature.

Statistics 

As of 2017, Martian craters account for 21% of all 5,211 named craters in the Solar System. Apart from the Moon, no other body has as many named craters as Mars. Other, non-planetary bodies with numerous named craters include Callisto (141), Ganymede (131), Rhea (128), Vesta (90), Ceres (90), Dione (73), Iapetus (58), Enceladus (53), Tethys (50) and Europa (41). For a full list, see List of craters in the Solar System. The total number of craters on Mars greater than 1 kilometre in diameter is approximately 385,000, with 21% of those (~85,000) being over 3 kilometers in diameter. The number of craters on Mars over 25 metres in diameter is suggested to be approximately 90 million.

Largest craters 

Some of the largest craters on Mars remain unnamed. Diameters differ depending on source data. The largest confirmed impact basins on Mars are Utopia (buried, estimated diameter 3,300 km) Hellas (2,300 km), Argyre ( 1,800 km) and Isidis (1,500 km).

Notes

Example crater

See also 

 List of catenae on Mars
 List of mountains on Mars

References

External links
 USGS: Martian system nomenclature
 The Origin of Mars Crater Names 

Mars